Cacém may refer to:

Agualva-Cacém, a city in the municipality of Sintra, Portugal.
Cacém (Sintra), a parish in the municipality of Sintra, Portugal.
Santiago do Cacém, a municipality the district of Setúbal, Portugal.